Cristopher Jesús Penroz Patiño (born 2 May 1990) is a Chilean footballer of Palestinian descent who currently plays for Deportes Melipilla as a defender.

Honours

Club
Colo-Colo
Primera División (1): 2009 Clausura

Magallanes
Tercera A (1): 2010

Deportes Santa Cruz
Segunda División (1): 2018

References

External links

Penroz at Football Lineups

1990 births
Living people
Chilean people of Palestinian descent
Footballers from Santiago
Chilean footballers
Colo-Colo footballers
Magallanes footballers
Deportes Magallanes footballers
Colo-Colo B footballers
Deportes Santa Cruz footballers
General Velásquez footballers
Lautaro de Buin footballers
Deportes Melipilla footballers
Chilean Primera División players
Primera B de Chile players
Segunda División Profesional de Chile players
Association football defenders